Joelle King  (born 30 September 1988) is a professional squash player who represents New Zealand. She reached a career-high world ranking of World No. 4 in April 2014.

Early life 
King was born and raised in Cambridge, New Zealand. She is the youngest child in her family, having two older brothers. Of Māori descent, she affiliates to Ngāti Porou.

Career 
In July 2009, King won the Australian Women's Open by beating Annie Au in the final played at Clare, South Australia.

King won one gold and one silver medal at the 2010 Commonwealth Games. She also won a bronze medal at the 2014 Commonwealth Games and a gold medal at the 2018 Commonwealth Games.

During the 2018 Commonwealth Games, King won the gold medal in the women's singles event for New Zealand. On the other side, fellow New Zealand squash player, Paul Coll clinched a silver medal in the men's singles event. This was also the first instance where a male and a female squash player from New Zealand had managed to qualify in the final of the respective events at a Commonwealth Games event.
She won her first platinum event on the WSA tour at the 2018 Hong Kong Squash Open beating Raneem El Weleily 3–0 in the final.

King was the flagbearer for New Zealand at the Birmingham Commonwealth Games 2022 alongside Tom Walsh.

Personal life 
On 28 December 2012, King married cricketer Ryan Shutte in Cambridge. He put his cricket career on hold to become her manager.

References

External links 

1988 births
Living people
New Zealand female squash players
Commonwealth Games gold medallists for New Zealand
Commonwealth Games silver medallists for New Zealand
Commonwealth Games bronze medallists for New Zealand
Commonwealth Games medallists in squash
Squash players at the 2010 Commonwealth Games
Squash players at the 2014 Commonwealth Games
Squash players at the 2018 Commonwealth Games
Sportspeople from Cambridge, New Zealand
New Zealand Māori sportspeople
Ngāti Porou people
Members of the New Zealand Order of Merit
Squash players at the 2022 Commonwealth Games
Medallists at the 2010 Commonwealth Games
Medallists at the 2014 Commonwealth Games
Medallists at the 2018 Commonwealth Games
Medallists at the 2022 Commonwealth Games